Bowker is a surname. Notable people with the surname include:

Alan Bowker, Canadian diplomat and educator
Albert H. Bowker (1919–2008), American educator
Aldrich Bowker (1875–1947), American actor
Art Bowker (born 1961), American writer
David Bowker (sailor) (1922–2020), British sailor
David Bowker (writer), British author and screenwriter
Emily Bowker, British actress
Geoffrey C. Bowker, American professor of informatics
Gordon Bowker, American businessman
Horace Bowker (1877–1954), American businessman
James Bowker (1901–1983), British ambassador
James Henry Bowker (1822–1900), South African naturalist and soldier
Joe Bowker (1881–1955), English boxer
John Bowker (theologian) (born 1935), English Anglican priest and scholar
John Bowker (baseball) (born 1983), American baseball player
Joseph Bowker (1725–1784), American politician
Judi Bowker (born 1954), English actress
Keith Bowker (born 1951), Former English Professional Footballer
Neville Bowker, Rhodesian fighter ace
Peter Bowker (born 1958), British playwright and screenwriter
Radney Bowker (born 1979), British rugby player
Richard Bowker (Australian businessman) (1815–1903), Australian physician, surgeon and politician
Richard Rogers Bowker (1848–1933), American journalist and businessman
 R. R. Bowker, American publishing industry support company
Richard Bowker (British businessman) (born 1966), CEO of National Express and Strategic Rail Authority
Richard Bowker (writer) (born 1950), American writer of crime and science fiction
Silas Bowker (1769–1834), American politician